South Carolina Highway 109 (SC 109) is a  primary state highway in the U.S. state of South Carolina. It serves to connect Chesterfield with central Chesterfield County and McBee.

Route description
SC 109 is a two-lane rural highway that traverses from SC 145 through Ruby and Mount Croghan, to the North Carolina state line.

History
SC 109 was established in either 1937 or 1938 as a new primary route from SC 9 in Mount Croghan to the North Carolina state line. In 1939, it was extended south to SC 85. In 1941 or 1942, SC 109 was extended south again to U.S. Route 15 (US 15) in Hartsville; there was also a  separate piece connecting SC 155 to US 52.  In 1948, SC 109 moved back to its current southern terminus at SC 145; both the former extension and separate piece were downgraded to secondary roads.

Junction list

See also

References

External links

109
Transportation in Chesterfield County, South Carolina